Rasmus Persson may refer to:
 Rasmus Persson (footballer)
 Rasmus Persson (radio personality)